Statherotis leucaspis is a moth of the family Tortricidae first described by Edward Meyrick in 1902. It is found in Thailand, the Maldives, Java, the Marshall Islands, the Ellice Islands, India, Sri Lanka and the Seychelles.

The wingspan is 13.5–14 mm for males and 12–15 mm for females.

References

Moths described in 1902
Olethreutini
Fauna of Seychelles